CLG An Cheathrú Rua is a Gaelic Athletic Association club based in the Gaeltacht area of Carraroe, County Galway, Ireland. The club is a member of the Galway GAA. Notable players include Seán Óg de Paor and Sean Ó Domhnaill, members of Galway's  All-Ireland winning teams of 1998 and 2001.

In 1996, they became the first Gaeltacht, and second Connemara club to win the Galway Senior Club Football Championship beating Oranmore/Maree in the final.  The only previous time the county championship was won by a Connemara side was in 1938 when it was won by Oughterard.

Achievements

 Galway Senior Football Championship (1): 1996
 Galway Intermediate Football Championship (1): 1987
 Comórtas Peile na Gaeltachta Champions (1): 1997
 Sweeney Oil Football League (1): 2008
 West Galway Under-21 A Football Championship (1): 2015
 West Galway Minor B2 Football League Champions (1): 2017
 West Galway Under 21 B Football Championship (2):''' 2013,2017

Notable players
 Seán Óg de Paor

External links
 

Gaelic football clubs in County Galway
Gaelic games clubs in County Galway